Howard Island is an island directly south of Hartshorne Island in eastern Joubin Islands, at the south-western end of the Palmer Archipelago of Antarctica. It was named by the US Advisory Committee on Antarctic Names (US-ACAN) for Judson R. Howard, mate in the RV Hero on her first voyage to Palmer Station in 1968.

See also 
 List of Antarctic and sub-Antarctic islands

References 

Islands of the Palmer Archipelago